Vano Karkadze is a Georgian rugby union player who plays as a hooker for Aurillac. He was called into the Georgia U20 squad for the 2017 World Rugby Under 20 Championship. In 2019, Karkadze made his debut for the Georgia national rugby union team at the age of 18, during the 2019 Rugby Europe Championship.  He is the youngest player at the 2019 Rugby World Cup in Japan.

Biography 
A member of RC Aia, Vano Karkadze participates in the 2018 European Under-18 Rugby Union Championships with the Georgian selection. He notably scored a try in the victorious final against France. He was then spotted by the Stade Aurillacois, which integrated him into its academy, playing in Hopes. He signs a 3-year contract in favor of Aurillac.

During his season at Aurillac, he will make three appearances in Pro D2. During this season, he had his first selection for Georgia against Romania. He participated in the wake of the 2019 World Junior Rugby Union Championship. At the end of the season, he was finally debauched by CA Brive, who signed him for two seasons with his academy, coached by his compatriot Goderdzi Shvelidze.

In September 2019, he joined the Georgian squad for the 2019 Rugby World Cup, where he will come into play against Uruguay.

During the 2019-2020 season, he obtained playing time with the professionals in the Challenge Cup, and achieved his first scoresheet in the Top 14 against Aviron bayonnais. Before the 2020-2021 season, he injured himself (ruptured cruciate ligaments), and will be unavailable for several months.

References

2000 births
Living people
Rugby union players from Georgia (country)
Georgia international rugby union players
Rugby union hookers